Hadogenes bicolor is a species of scorpion endemic to South Africa. This species is often confused with H. troglodytes.

Description
The legs, tail and chelicerae of H. bicolor are paler than the carapace, forming a marked color contrast. The overall appearance is consistent with that of the other members of Hadogenes, the body construction is flattened which allows them to navigate safely in and out the cracks and crevices that comprise their habitats.

Distribution and ecology

Hadogenes bicolor is endemic to Mpumalanga and Limpopo provinces, South Africa.

Taxonomy
Hadogenes bicolor was first described by W. F. Purcell in 1899, based on material collected by the Reverend J. W. Daneel "about twenty miles east of Pietersburg [now Polokwane], Zoutpansberg Distr., Transvaal". The name Hadogenes bicolor has previously been used to cover animals now recognised as three separate species, H. bicolor, H. longimanus and H. newlandsi. Many of the scorpions sold in the pet trade as H. bicolor are actually H. troglodytes.

References

Hormuridae
Arthropods of South Africa
Endemic fauna of South Africa
Animals described in 1899